Michael Nakasone is a band director. Born in Hawaii, he led the Hawaii Youth Symphony, the Pearl City High School (Hawaii) Band, the Royal Hawaiian Band, and most recently the Punahou School Wind Ensemble.

Early life
Nakasone was raised in Hilo and enrolled in several public schools in the vicinity, until graduating from Hilo High School. He was a keyboard player for a local rock band during the 1960s. At the University of Hawaii at Manoa, he earned his bachelor's and master's degrees in music education.

Career
In 1968, Nakasone started his career as a band director at the Wahiawa Intermediate School. He then moved to Mililani High School in 1973, and then taught at the Pearl City High School in 1977. In 1992, he was named director of the PCHS Performing Arts Learning Center. He contributed much to the construction of the Pearl City Cultural Arts Center. Under Nakasone's direction, the Pearl City Marching Band has performed in the Aloha Festivals Parade (Hawaii), Macy's Thanksgiving Day Parade New York, the Tournament of Roses Parade (Pasadena), and the Ginza Parade (Tokyo).

In 2004, Nakasone retired from his position as the band director of the Pearl City Marching Band and 37 years with the Hawaii DOE to become the band director of the Royal Hawaiian Band. He served as a conductor with the Royal Hawaiian Band until 2010.

In June 2012, Nakasone became the band director at Punahou School; in 2016 he retired.

He later taught as a substitute for many schools such as Campbell and Pearl City.

Recognition
The 1991 John Philip Sousa Foundation's Sudler Flag of Honor, the highest international recognition of a high school for excellence in concert performance;
In 1995, the Band World Legion of Honor recognized Nakasone as one of the 10 best band directors in the nation;
The 1996 Hawaii Department of Education's Teacher of the Year.

External links
Michael Nakasone by the Royal Hawaiian Band
Michael Nakasone by UHS
Michael Nakasone by Troy

References

American educators
University of Hawaiʻi at Mānoa alumni
Living people
Year of birth missing (living people)